Asphaltum was an unincorporated community in Gillam Township, Jasper County, Indiana.

Geography

History

Asphaltum was platted by B. F. Rouse in 1901 at the peak of an oil boom in the area. An oil refinery was built by the American Lubricating and Refining Company and operated for a short time. The oil wells which led to the town's creation were fed by shallow deposits that soon failed to yield after hundreds of wells were put down in the area. The crude oil given up by these wells was sulfurous and of low quality.

A post office opened at Asphaltum in 1901, and closed in 1904.

References

Unincorporated communities in Jasper County, Indiana
Unincorporated communities in Indiana